Tomsky (masculine), Tomskaya (feminine), or Tomskoye (neuter) is the name of several rural localities in Russia:
Tomsky (rural locality), a settlement in Taborinsky District of Sverdlovsk Oblast
Tomskoye, Amur Oblast, a selo in Tomsky Rural Settlement of Seryshevsky District of Amur Oblast
Tomskoye, Kemerovo Oblast, a selo in Safonovskaya Rural Territory of Prokopyevsky District of Kemerovo Oblast
Tomskoye, Khabarovsk Krai, a selo in Khabarovsky District of Khabarovsk Krai
Tomskoye, Tomsk Oblast, a selo in Tomsky District of Tomsk Oblast
Tomskaya, Omutinsky District, Tyumen Oblast, a village in Bolshekrasnoyarsky Rural Okrug of Omutinsky District of Tyumen Oblast
Tomskaya, Vagaysky District, Tyumen Oblast, a village in Ptitsky Rural Okrug of Vagaysky District of Tyumen Oblast